Vatica pachyphylla is a species of flowering plant in the family Dipterocarpaceae.

Distribution
Vatica pachyphylla is endemic to the Philippines, where it is confined to eastern Luzon and Polillo Island.

It is a tropical tree species found in the Luzon rain forests ecoregion. It is restricted to very low-altitude evergreen dipterocarp forest habitats of the ecoregion.

It is an endangered species threatened by habitat loss.

See also
 List of threatened species of the Philippines

References

External links

pachyphylla
Endemic flora of the Philippines
Flora of Luzon
Trees of the Philippines
Taxonomy articles created by Polbot
Taxa named by Elmer Drew Merrill

Endangered flora of Asia